Udea numeralis is a species of moth in the family Crambidae described by Jacob Hübner in 1796. It is found in  Southern Europe and North Africa.

The wingspan is about 26 mm.

References

Moths described in 1796
numeralis
Moths of Europe
Moths of Asia